Byzantines may refer to:
The citizens of the Byzantine Empire in antiquity
The Byzantine Greeks or Eastern Romans, the ruling class of the Byzantine Empire.
The population of the Byzantine Empire, including all separate ethnic and tribal groups living there

See also
 Byzantine (disambiguation)